Oliver Pagé (born 10 April 1971) is a German former footballer who played as a centre-back. He is best known for playing in the Bundesliga with Bayer 04 Leverkusen and Dynamo Dresden.

Career
Pagé made 9 appearances in the Bundesliga for Bayer 04 Leverkusen and Dynamo Dresden, scoring once.

External links
 
 
 
 Oliver Page Interview
 Oliver Page-The German on a Kenyan soccer development mission 
 Up Close with Oliver Page on Kenyan Football

References

1971 births
Living people
People from Mayen-Koblenz
German footballers
Association football defenders
Bayer 04 Leverkusen II players
Bayer 04 Leverkusen players
Dynamo Dresden players
Rot-Weiss Essen players
Bundesliga players
Footballers from Rhineland-Palatinate